Frances Clarke may refer to:

 Frances Clarke (charity executive) of England, president of the Venice in Peril Fund
 Frances Clarke Sayers, née Clarke (1897–1989), American librarian and author
 Frances Elizabeth Bellenden Clarke, later Sarah Grand (1854–1943)

See also 
 Frances Clark (disambiguation)
 Francis Clark (disambiguation)
 Francis Clarke (disambiguation)